is a 2018 Japanese animated action fantasy film based on the Pretty Cure franchise created by Izumi Todo, and its first and fifteenth series, Futari wa Pretty Cure and Hug! Pretty Cure. The film is directed by Hiroshi Miyamoto, written by Junko Komura, and produced by Toei Animation. The film was released in Japanese theaters on October 27, 2018.

Celebrating the 15th anniversary of the franchise and the eleventh entry to the Pretty Cure All Stars crossover film series, the Hug! Pretty Cure team joins forces with Futari wa Pretty Cure team to retrieve stolen powers and memories of other Pretty Cure teams from an vengeful teru teru bōzu named Miden.

The film topped Japanese box office records in its first release in theaters and currently owns the Guinness World Record for "Most Magical Warriors in an Anime Film", with a total of 55 Pretty Cures, spanning thirteen generations.

Plot

A teru teru bōzu named Miden shows up before Hug! Pretty Cure team: Hana, Saaya, Homare, Emiru and Ruru during their picnic. They transform and fight, and as the fight ensues, they notice that Miden is using other Pretty Cure teams' attacks. Miden blasts a mysterious beam, but Ange, Etoile, Macherie and Amour shields its attack from Yell, but turns them into babies in the process. The Futari wa Pretty Cure team: Cures Black and White arrives and protect Yell and the kids, but Miden disappears after turning White into a baby. Moments later, Nagisa explains to Hana that every other Pretty Cures, including Hikari had their memories stolen when Miden turned them into toddlers. 

After finding their baby teammates, who had run off, Miden shows up to Hana and Nagisa again. After Nagisa demands to give Honoka's memory back, Miden furiously attacks both girls, which causes Honoka to revert back to normal herself. They transform and fight Miden, and with courage and determination, Hana assists the two Cures. While cheering for Yell, the rest of Hug! team reverts back to their normal age. Even more furious, Miden takes the towns' memories and leads them to his lair. 

After exploring his lair, the Cures find out that Miden is an abandoned camera, which Yell notices his pain of loneliness as everyone he knew had forgotten about him. After Harry and Hugtan help restore rest of the Pretty Cures' normal selves with the power of the Miracle Light, the 55 Pretty Cures help fight off Miden's shadows, while Yell comforts Miden as she assures him that they'll make new memories. The Pretty Cures, with the power of the Miracle Lights, uses "Pretty Cure Release Shining Memory" to heal him, which he smiles and fades away. Later, Hana then takes pictures of everyone at the picnic with a fixed Miden camera.

Voice cast

Hug! Pretty Cure cast

Rie Hikisaka as Hana Nono/Cure Yell
Rina Honnizumi as Saaya Yakushiji/Cure Ange
Yui Ogura as Homare Kagayaki/Cure Etoile
Nao Tamura as Emiru Aisako/Cure Macherie
Yukari Tamura as Ruru Amour/Cure Amour
Konomi Tada as Hugtan
Junko Noda as Hariham Harry
Jun Fukushima as Hariham's human form

Futari wa Pretty Cure cast
Yōko Honna as Nagisa Misumi/Cure Black
Yukana as Honoka Yukishiro/Cure White
Rie Tanaka as Hikari Kujo/Shiny Luminous
Tomokazu Seki as Mepple
Akiko Yajima as Mipple

Futari wa Pretty Cure Splash Star cast
Orie Kimoto as Saki Hyuuga/Cure Bloom/Cure Bright
Atsuko Enomoto as Mai Mishou/Cure Egret/Cure Windy

Yes! Pretty Cure 5 cast
Yūko Sanpei as Nozomi Yumehara/Cure Dream
Junko Takeuchi as Rin Natsuki/Cure Rouge
Mariya Ise as Urara Kasugano/Cure Lemonade
Ai Nagano as Komachi Akimoto/Cure Mint
Ai Maeda as Karen Minazuki/Cure Aqua
Eri Sendai as Milk/Kurumi Mimino/Milky Rose

Fresh Pretty Cure! cast
Kanae Oki as Love Momozono/Cure Peach
Eri Kitamura as Miki Aono/Cure Berry
Akiko Nakagawa as Inori Yamabuki/Cure Pine
Yuka Komatsu as Setsuna Higashi/Cure Passion

HeartCatch PreCure! cast
 Nana Mizuki as Tsubomi Hanasaki/Cure Blossom
Fumie Mizusawa as Erika Kurumi/Cure Marine
Houko Kuwashima as Itsuki Miyoudouin/Cure Sunshine
Aya Hisakawa as Yuri Tsukikage/Cure Moonlight

Suite PreCure cast
Ami Koshimizu as Hibiki Hojo/Cure Melody
Fumiko Orikasa as Kanade Minamino/Cure Rhythm
Megumi Toyoguchi as Siren/Ellen Kurokawa/Cure Beat
Rumi Okubo as Ako Shirabe/Cure Muse

Smile PreCure! cast
Misato Fukuen as Miyuki Hoshizora/Cure Happy
Asami Tano as Akane Hino/Cure Sunny
Hisako Kanemoto as Yayoi Kise/Cure Peace
Marina Inoue as Nao Midorikawa/Cure March
Chinami Nishimura as Reika Aoki/Cure Beauty

DokiDoki! PreCure cast
Hitomi Nabatame as Mana Aida/Cure Heart
Minako Kotobuki as Rikka Hishikawa/Cure Diamond
Mai Fuchigami as Alice Yotsuba/Cure Rosetta
Kanako Miyamoto as Makoto Kenzaki/Cure Sword
Rie Kugimiya as Aguri Madoka/Cure Ace

HappinessCharge PreCure! cast
Megumi Nakajima as Megumi Aino/Cure Lovely
Megumi Han as Hime Shirayuki/Cure Princess
Rina Kitagawa as Yūko Omori/Cure Honey
Haruka Tomatsu as Iona Hikawa/Cure Fortune

Go! Princess PreCure cast
Yū Shimamura as Haruka Haruno/Cure Flora
Masumi Asano as Minami Kaido/Cure Mermaid
Hibiku Yamamura as Kirara Amanogawa/Cure Twinkle
Miyuki Sawashiro as Towa Akagi/Cure Scarlet

Witchy PreCure! cast
Rie Takahashi as Mirai Asahina/Cure Miracle
Yui Horie as Riko Izayoi/Cure Magical
Saori Hayami as Kotoha Hanami/Cure Felice
Ayaka Saitō as Mofurun

Kirakira Pretty Cure a la Mode cast
Karen Miyama as Ichika Usami/Cure Whip
Haruka Fukuhara as Himari Arisugawa/Cure Custard
Tomo Muranaka as Aoi Tategami/Cure Gelato
Saki Fujita as Yukari Kotozume/Cure Macaron
Nanako Mori as Akira Tenjō/Cure Chocolat
Inori Minase as Kirarin/Ciel Kirahoshi/Cure Parfait

Film characters 
Mamoru Miyano as Miden, a white teru teru bozu-like monster that steals the Pretty Cures' memories and powers, and turns them into infants. It also sprouts offshoots that swarm like locusts. Miyano said that he was excited to have the 55 Cures gather together in a single movie.
Mizuki Yamamoto as herself; in the film, she is a reporter who falls in the crossroads of the battle between a monster and the Futari wa Pretty Cures. Yamamoto, an anime enthusiast and a big Pretty Cure fan, said, "I was really happy when I was talking and I was really impressed when I talked to the Pretty Cure that I had longed for."
Tasuku Kida as the mysterious monster that attacks Minato Mirai 21 in the beginning of the film.

Production 
On 17 March 2018, it was announced that there a film featuring Futari wa Pretty Cure was in the works, and the film's title was announced on June 17 of the same year. The 15th anniversary film of the Pretty Cure franchise, it is a crossover between the current series Hug! Pretty Cure and the inaugural series Futari wa Pretty Cure, and marks the first time since 2016 where all of the Pretty Cures appear at once.

Similar to Pretty Cure Dream Stars!, in addition to Hiroshi Miyamoto returning as director, the film combines cel animation and computer-generated animation. The Pretty Cure dialogue was recorded twice, and the CGI sequence started in January 2018, ahead of Hug! Pretty Cure'''s premiere. Production of the cel animation started in August 2018.

There were several tie-ins with Yokohama City. A Pretty Cure special stage dance involving the Kanto Gakuin University cheerleading dance team Fits was held at Minato Mirai Smart Festival 2018. A fifteenth anniversary exhibition was held at Yokohama Landmark Tower for eight days, and Mizuki Yamamoto, who appeared in the film as the reporter, hosted a women-only space called "PRECURE GIRLS 'NIGHT" on September 21. On October 21, the week before the film release, a premiere screening was held at Yokohama Burg 13, and all the 55 Pretty Cure costumes appeared at Grand Mall Park. In addition, various places in Yokohama City including Yokohama Minato Mirai 21 are used as a part of the stage everywhere in the work including the first scene.

Music
Single
The single, released on October 24, 2018, topped at #35 in the Oricon Singles Chart on November 5, 2018.

Soundtrack
The soundtrack was released on October 24, 2018. It topped #124 in the Oricon Albums Chart on November 5, 2018.

Reception and accolades
The film earned 357 million yen during the first two days of release (October 27 and 28).映画『プリキュア』最新作が公開2日で歴代最高の大ヒットスタートに , アニメイトタイムズ,2018年10月29日 This was the third Pretty Cure film in a row to rank first place. Pia gave the film a first place ranking at 92.4. Toei described it as "the biggest hit start of Spring and Autumn compared to the 24 films so far".

With a revenue of 1.15 billion yen, All Stars Memories is the highest-grossing Pretty Cure film since Pretty Cure All Stars DX2: Light of Hope - Protect the Rainbow Jewel!''.

With 55 Pretty Cures in the movie, Guinness World Records approved the movie for the world record of "Most Magical Warriors in An Anime Film" on 27 October 2018. The film also won the Best 3D in an Anime award at the 2018 CGWorld Awards and the Best Film award at the 2019 VFX Japan Awards.

References

External links
  
 

Japanese magical girl films
2018 films
Pretty Cure films
Toei Animation films
2010s Japanese films
2018 anime films
Crossover anime and manga
Guinness World Records
Films about babies
Films about amnesia
Films about memory
Films scored by Yuki Hayashi